Dušan Šešok is a former Slovenian politician. He served as the country's second Minister of Finance (formally as 'Secretary of Finance') from 9 May 1991 to 14 May 1992.

References 

Living people
Year of birth missing (living people)
Place of birth missing (living people)
Finance ministers of Slovenia
20th-century Slovenian politicians